Jealousy Is My Middle Name (lit. “Jealousy is My Strength”) is a 2003 South Korean film. It won Best Film honors at the Busan International Film Festival and the Rotterdam Film Festival and was the directorial debut of Park Chan-ok. It was inspired by the poem of the same name by Ki Hyung-do.

Plot
Quiet, intelligent, solemn and recently dumped by his girlfriend, graduate student Lee Weon-san (Park Hae-il) takes a job at a literary magazine, ostensibly to supplement his income, but really to get close to the editor - the reason he's now single. The editor (Moon Sung-keun), unaware of who Lee is, takes a shine to him and makes him his personal assistant. He likes having him around as he's the only person he feels comfortable with, which means he often takes advantage of Lee's passive nature, making him run errands for him all over town.

The fiercely independent Lee, however, works without complaint, having started a new relationship with part-time photographer/part-time vet Park Seong-yeon (Bae Jong-ok). When she takes a full-time job at the magazine, however, Lee pleads with her not to get involved with the editor, a plea that goes unheeded and sets Lee thinking once again about vengeance. It's here that the film really starts to veer from the conventional path.

Awards and nominations
2002 Busan International Film Festival
 New Currents Award

2003 International Film Festival Rotterdam
 Tiger Award

2003 Busan Film Critics Awards
 Best New Actor – Park Hae-il

2003 Chunsa Film Art Awards
 Best New Actor – Park Hae-il

2003 Blue Dragon Film Awards
 Best Screenplay – Park Chan-ok

2003 Korean Film Awards
 Best New Actor – Park Hae-il

2003 Director's Cut Awards
 Best New Actor – Park Hae-il

References

External links
 
 
 

2003 films
2000s Korean-language films
Films directed by Park Chan-ok
South Korean drama films
2003 directorial debut films
2000s South Korean films